Asmund Kristoffersen (born 5 November 1944 in Flakstad) is a retired Norwegian politician for the Labour Party.

He was elected to the Norwegian Parliament from Møre og Romsdal in 1993 and has since been re-elected on three occasions.

On the local level he was a member of the Tingvoll municipal council from 1979 to 1991 and the Møre og Romsdal county council from 1983 to 1993.

Before becoming a full-time politician, he spent several years in the Norwegian education system: first as a teacher, later as a principal at two different schools, and then as the head of the school administration in the county of Tingvoll.

References

1944 births
Living people
Members of the Storting
Møre og Romsdal politicians
Labour Party (Norway) politicians
Volda University College alumni
21st-century Norwegian politicians
20th-century Norwegian politicians
People from Flakstad